The Album is the first studio album by Latyrx, an American hip hop duo consisting of Lateef the Truthspeaker and Lyrics Born. It was released on Solesides in 1997, and it was re-released on Quannum Projects in 2002.

Critical reception

Steve Huey of AllMusic gave the album 4.5 stars out of 5, saying, "Enough people heard the record to make it something of an underground legend, but its potential influence wound up unfortunately limited, especially given how forward-looking the music on The Album is." He added, "its key tracks are nothing short of visionary, making it an essential listen."

In 2015, Fact placed it at number 67 on the "100 Best Indie Hip-Hop Records of All Time" list.

Track listing

References

External links
 

1997 debut albums
Latyrx albums
Quannum Projects albums
Albums produced by DJ Shadow